Sichuanese, Szechuanese or Szechwanese may refer to something of, from, or related to the Chinese province and region of Sichuan (Szechwan/Szechuan) (historically and culturally including Chongqing), especially:
Sichuanese people, a subgroup of the Han Chinese
Sichuanese culture or Ba–Shu culture
Sichuanese cuisine
Sichuanese embroidery
Ba–Shu Chinese (Old Sichuanese), an extinct language in the Sinitic (Chinese) language family
Sichuanese language, a branch of Southwest Mandarin 
Sichuanese Standard Chinese, a dialect of standard Putonghua Mandarin Chinese